Marko Kordić (born 22 February 1995) is a Montenegrin football goalkeeper who plays for Iskra Danilovgrad.

Club career

Vojvodina
Kordić joined Vojvodina's first team for season 2011–12, as a youth squad member. He was loaned to Bačka BP at the beginning of season 2013–14, but he returned in Vojvodina in short time, because of deficit of goalkeepers. In winter break off-season, he injured Cruciate ligaments and ended that season. After recovery, he regularly trained with other players in the 2014–15 season. Kordić made solid performances in winter break off-season and confirmed full recovery. He made his professional debut for Vojvodina in away match against OFK Beograd in 16th round of Serbian SuperLiga played on 21 February 2015 at the Omladinski Stadium and ended with draw result, 0:0.

References

External links
 
 Marko Kordić profile at mojklub.rs
 Marko Kordić stats at utakmica.rs 
 

1995 births
Living people
Footballers from Podgorica
Association football goalkeepers
Montenegrin footballers
Montenegro youth international footballers
Montenegro under-21 international footballers
FK Vojvodina players
OFK Bačka players
OFK Grbalj players
FK Bokelj players
FK Napredak Kruševac players
FK Iskra Danilovgrad players
Serbian SuperLiga players
Montenegrin First League players
Montenegrin Second League players
Montenegrin expatriate footballers
Expatriate footballers in Serbia
Montenegrin expatriate sportspeople in Serbia